The Global Location Number (GLN) is part of the GS1 systems of standards.  It is a simple tool used to identify a location and can identify locations uniquely where required. This identifier is compliant with norm ISO/IEC 6523.

The GS1 Identification Key is used to identify physical locations or legal entities. The key comprises a GS1 Company Prefix, Location Reference, and Check Digit.

Location identified with GLN could be a physical location such as a warehouse or a legal entity such as a company or customer or a function that takes place within a legal entity. It can also be used to identify something as specific as a particular shelf in a store.  Being able to identify locations with a unique number is a key to many business processes. The GLN is used in electronic messaging between customers and suppliers, where location advice is important. GLN is also used within companies to identify specific locations both electronically in a database and physically where the GLN can be produced in a bar code or GS1 EPC tag.

GLN structure 
GLN is a 13-digit number structured as follows:

EAN (GLN, GTIN, EAN numbers administered by GS1) 
EAN (European Article Number) check digits (administered by GS1) are calculated by summing the even position numbers and multiplying by 3 and then by adding the sum of the odd position numbers. To calculate the check digit, subtract the sum from the equal or nearest higher multiple of ten.
A GS1 check digit calculator and detailed documentation is online at GS1's website.
Another official calculator page shows that the mechanism for GTIN-13 is the same for Global Location Number/GLN.

See also 
 Global Trade Item Number

References

External links 
Global Location Number at GS1 website
 GS1 official site
 GLN (Global Location Number)
 Check Digit Calculator, and documentation, at GS1 official site
 Check Digit Calculator, and documentation in pdf format, at GS1 US official site  (states the same mechanism for GLN and GTIN-13)

Barcodes
Identifiers
Unique identifiers
GS1 standards